Mount Longhurst is a prominent mountain,  high, standing west of Mill Mountain and forming the highest point of Festive Plateau in the Cook Mountains of Antarctica. It was discovered by the British National Antarctic Expedition (1901–04) and named for Cyril Longhurst, secretary of the expedition.

References

Mountains of Oates Land